Friedrich Jokisch (born 17 November 1952, date of death unknown) was a Salvadoran swimmer. He competed in four events at the 1968 Summer Olympics.

References

1952 births
Year of death missing
Salvadoran male swimmers
Olympic swimmers of El Salvador
Swimmers at the 1968 Summer Olympics
Sportspeople from San Salvador